Zeuzera pyrina, the leopard moth or wood leopard moth, is a moth of the family Cossidae.

It is considered a pest by fruit growers, as the larvae feed on branches of many kinds of fruit trees (see list below). Olive trees in particular are very susceptible and can be killed by the larvae burrowing within them.

Subspecies
Subspecies include:
Zeuzera pyrina biebingeri W. & A. Speidel, 1986
Zeuzera pyrina pyrina (Linnaeus 1761)

Zeuzera biebingeri is treated as a subspecies of Z. pyrina by some sources, but is mostly treated as a valid species.

Distribution
This species can be found primarily in Europe (excluding Ireland) but also in northern Africa (Algeria, Egypt, Libya, Morocco) and Asia (Taiwan, India, Iran, Iraq, Israel, Japan, Korea, Lebanon, Sri Lanka, Syria, Turkey). It was introduced into the northeastern United States prior to 1879 and has a range extending from Maine, Pennsylvania, Tennessee and Texas.

Habitat
These moths are associated with woodland, gardens and orchards.

Description
Zeuzera pyrina has a wingspan of 35–60 mm. This is a highly distinctive species. The male is slightly smaller than the female. The length of the abdomen of the female is about 45–50 mm. These moths have a white head, with a black forehead and a very furry white thorax marked with six black spots. The abdomen is black, with short white hair-like scales on the posterior edge of each segment and a flat brush of scales on the apex. Forewings are whitish, long and narrow, with numerous black spots or black spots with white interior spots, arranged in rows along the veins. Hindwings are translucent, except in the anal area, with small black spots. In addition to the dimensions, the two sexes differ in the shape of the antennas, thinner in the female, while in the male they are markedly bipectinate, with the exception of terminals articles.

Biology
The moth flies from June to September depending on the location. The caterpillars are xylophagous. They feed on the wood of various deciduous trees and shrubs (see list below), feeding internally for two or three years in the stems and branches before emerging to pupate under the bark. It can be a pest of fruit production.

Recorded host plants
Recorded food plants include:

Acer
Aesculus
Amelanchier
Broussonetia
Carya
Castanea
Celtis
Ceratonia
Cotoneaster
Crataegus
Cydonia
Fagus
Fraxinus
Ilex
Juglans
Ligustrum
Liquidambar
Liriodendron
Lonicera
Malus
Olea
Prunus
Punica
Pyrus
Quercus
Rhododendron
Ribes
Robinia
Rubus
Salix
Syringa
Tilia
Ulmus
Viburnum

Gallery

Bibliography

Capinera, J. L. (Ed.), Encyclopedia of Entomology, 4 vol., 2nd Ed., Dordrecht, Springer Science+Business Media B.V., 2008, pp. lxiii + 4346, LCCN 2008930112, OCLC 837039413.
Lieutier F., Day K. R., Battisti A., Grégoire J.-C. and Evans H. F. (Eds.), Bark and Wood Boring Insects in Living Trees in Europe, a Synthesis, ristampa 1ª ed., Dordrecht; Boston, Springer; Kluwer Academic Publishers, 2007 [2004], pp. xiv, 569, LCCN 2004051536, OCLC 55645086.
Scoble, M. J., The Lepidoptera: Form, Function and Diversity, 2nd ed., London, Oxford University Press & Natural History Museum, 2011 [1992], pp. xi, 404, LCCN 92004297, OCLC 25282932.
Stehr, F. W. (Ed.), Immature Insects, 2 vol., Dubuque, Iowa, Kendall/Hunt Pub. Co., 1991 [1987], pp. ix, 754, LCCN 85081922, OCLC 13784377.

References

External links

Lepiforum e. V.
De Vlinderstichting 
 Paolo Mazzei, Daniel Morel, Raniero Panfili Moths and Butterflies of Europe and North Africa

Zeuzerinae
Moths of Europe
Insects of Turkey
Taxa named by Carl Linnaeus
Moths described in 1761